Raymond Edward Prochaska (August 9, 1919 – March 9, 1997) was an American gridiron football player and coach.

Prochaska was born in Ulysses, Nebraska, to Emil Prochaska and Marie Fredlick, having Czech and Moravian ancestry. He attended the University of Nebraska and played one season in the National Football League (NFL).  Prochaska made his professional debut in the NFL in 1941 with the Cleveland Rams before leaving football for military service during World War II.

Prochaska went on to be an assistant coach, often serving under Chuck Knox with multiple NFL teams, and in 1961 briefly served as interim head coach of the St. Louis Cardinals.  He coached under Knox with the Los Angeles Rams, Buffalo Bills, and Seattle Seahawks. After Pop Ivy resigned late in the season, Prochaska shared head coaching duties with fellow assistant coaches Chuck Drulis and Ray Willsey.  Under the trio's guidance, the team won its last two games.

References

External links
 

1919 births
1997 deaths
American football ends
Buffalo Bills coaches
Cleveland Browns coaches
Los Angeles Rams coaches
Edmonton Elks coaches
Nebraska Cornhuskers football coaches
Nebraska Cornhuskers football players
St. Louis Cardinals (football) coaches
St. Louis Cardinals (football) head coaches
Seattle Seahawks coaches
American military personnel of World War II
People from Butler County, Nebraska
Players of American football from Nebraska

American people of Czech descent